Yanina Gaitán (born 3 June 1978) is an Argentine former international footballer who played as a midfielder. She played for Argentina at the 2003 FIFA Women's World Cup. She scored against Germany for Argentina's only goal in the 2003 World Cup.

See also

References

1978 births
Living people
2003 FIFA Women's World Cup players
Argentine women's footballers
Argentina women's international footballers
Women's association football midfielders
Place of birth missing (living people)